Kvalsund is a village in the municipality of Herøy in Møre og Romsdal county, Norway. It is located on the island of Nerlandsøya. Kvalsund is a fishing port with a sizable deep-water harbor, marina, and waterfront protected by breakwaters.  Kvalsund is connected to the island of Bergsøya by the Nerlandsøy Bridge.

Population

Gallery

References

Populated places in Møre og Romsdal
Herøy, Møre og Romsdal
Viking Age populated places